Vostell is a surname. Notable people with the surname include:

David Vostell (born 1960), German-Spanish composer and film director
Mercedes Vostell (born 1933), Spanish writer
Wolf Vostell (1932–1998), German painter and sculptor

See also
Ostell